Lefkasio is a village and a former municipality in Achaea, West Greece, Greece. The municipality was renamed to Kleitoria in 2008, and in 2011 it became part of the municipality Kalavryta.

Historical population

References

External links
Greek Travel Pages

See also
List of settlements in Achaea

Populated places in Achaea